Zelowan is a genus of African ground spiders that was first described by J. A. Murphy & A. Russell-Smith in 2010.

Species
 it contains eighteen species:
Zelowan allegena Murphy & Russell-Smith, 2010 – Congo
Zelowan bulbiformis Murphy & Russell-Smith, 2010 – Congo
Zelowan cochleare Murphy & Russell-Smith, 2010 – Congo
Zelowan cordiformis Murphy & Russell-Smith, 2010 – Congo
Zelowan cuniculiformis Murphy & Russell-Smith, 2010 – Congo
Zelowan ensifer Murphy & Russell-Smith, 2010 – Congo
Zelowan etruricassis Murphy & Russell-Smith, 2010 – Congo
Zelowan falciformis Murphy & Russell-Smith, 2010 – Congo
Zelowan galea Murphy & Russell-Smith, 2010 – Congo
Zelowan larva Murphy & Russell-Smith, 2010 – Congo
Zelowan mammosa Murphy & Russell-Smith, 2010 – Congo
Zelowan nodivulva Murphy & Russell-Smith, 2010 – Burundi
Zelowan pyriformis Murphy & Russell-Smith, 2010 – Congo
Zelowan remota Murphy & Russell-Smith, 2010 – Namibia
Zelowan rostrata Murphy & Russell-Smith, 2010 – Congo
Zelowan rotundipalpis Murphy & Russell-Smith, 2010 – Congo
Zelowan similis Murphy & Russell-Smith, 2010 – Congo
Zelowan spiculiformis Murphy & Russell-Smith, 2010 (type) – Congo

References

Gnaphosidae
Araneomorphae genera
Spiders of Africa